National State Bank is a historic building located in Mount Pleasant, Iowa, United States.  Because this two story, brick Italianate structure was built specifically as a bank, it features a chamfered corner, which was commonly used to designate a bank in the last quarter of the 19th century.  However, it combines other features typical of an Italianate commercial building in an unusual way.  The secondary facade has segmental arched windows that are regularly spaced, while the primary facade has the windows in a sophisticated arrangement that one would expect of an architect-designed building.  (The potential architect of this building, or even its builder, are unknown.)  The metal cornice has widely spaced brackets on the primary facade and more typically spaced on the secondary facade.  It also lacks an identification pediment on the corner, which is typical of the style.  The building was listed on the National Register of Historic Places in 1991.

References

Commercial buildings completed in 1883
Buildings and structures in Mount Pleasant, Iowa
National Register of Historic Places in Henry County, Iowa
Bank buildings on the National Register of Historic Places in Iowa
Italianate architecture in Iowa